South Maroota is a suburb in Sydney, New South Wales, Australia 72 kilometres north-west of the Sydney central business district in the local government area of The Hills Shire. The Hawkesbury River forms part of its western boundary.

Heritage listings
South Maroota has a number of heritage-listed sites, including:
 Wisemans Ferry Road: Great Drain

Recreation
South Maroota contains the Pacific Park motocross and water-skiing park, on the bank of the Hawkesbury River.
In 1970 Sydney's largest naturist club Kiata Country Club was established

References

External links
 Pacific Park

Suburbs of Sydney
Hawkesbury River
The Hills Shire